Sweetwater River may refer to:

Sweetwater River (California), a river in San Diego County, California, USA 
(includes the North Fork Sweetwater River)
Sweetwater River (Wyoming), a river in Natrona County, Wyoming, USA 
(includes the East Sweetwater River and the Little Sweetwater River; both in Fremont County)

See also
 Sweetwater Creek (disambiguation)